The Hyundai Trajet (Hangul: 현대 트라제 ; pronounced as trajay), is a seven-seater car that was manufactured by Hyundai Motor Company between 1999 and 2008. Described as a multi-purpose vehicle (MPV), the series was officially launched in 1999, with the 2.0 GSI model and choices of gasoline, diesel, or LPG fuel. A limited-edition SE version with a 2.7 V6 engine was added in 2001.

Sales began in South Korea in spring 1999 and the UK premiere was at the London Motorfair in October of that year. Vehicle sales in Europe began in spring 2000.

The name is derived from the French word "trajet" which means "journey", "path, walk, course, haul, itinerary" or to "travel from one point to another." In South Korea, it was marketed as the Hyundai Trajet XG to align it with the more luxurious Grandeur XG which uses the same platform.

Overview

2000-2004
Hyundai developed a seven-seat MPV targeting large families and the shuttle market segments. It is based on the platform shared with the Sonata and the first-generation Santa Fe. The Trajet was styled in Frankfurt, and made its public debut at the 1999 London Motor Show. The front end design was similar to some U.S. minivans and featuring a chromed grille flanked by horizontal headlamps and a sedan-like front bumper. The Trajet's tall greenhouse, front-hinged side doors, and a large liftgate "made it look like a large station wagon."

The Trajet features three rows of seats. The front seats can rotate 180 degrees to face the passengers in the back when the car is stationary, and the back seats can also be turned into tables, making a virtual office space, or a picnic area. The second- and third-row seats are double folding and can also be completely removed. Because the Trajet size is bigger than many of its rivals, it provides comfort and room for seven adults as well as cargo space with all the seats in place.

According to reviews, the Trajet does not do as well compared to the best European and Japanese MPVs because of "an overly firm around town" that "becomes bouncy at speed" with a "lot of body lean around corners." The light steering does not have enough feedback, and the engines are noisy under acceleration.

2004-2008

The model range was updated in June 2004.

Trajets now included three point seat belts for all rear passengers. 

Departing from most minivans that offered sliding doors, Hyundai retained the regular hinged rear passenger doors. Following the pattern of U.S. minivans, the automatic transmission gear selector was mounted on the steering column and the center console was eliminated. For specific markets and engines, a 5-speed manual with a floor-mounted shifter between the front seats was available.

Rather than developing a new vehicle, Hyundai adapted an existing line market needs even though consumer trends had already shifted. Just like the name of the model "itself, meant a route to follow, and the vehicle was adequate for that. Production and marketing ended in 2008 without a direct successor.

References

External links 

Trajet
Minivans
Euro NCAP large MPVs
Cars introduced in 1999
2000s cars